In Nigeria, Sharia has been instituted as a main body of civil and criminal law in twelve Muslim-majority states  since 1999, when then-Zamfara State governor Ahmad Sani Yerima began the push for the institution of Sharia at the state level of government.  A "declaration of full Sharia law" was made in the twelve states in that year, and the states created  Islamic legal institutions such as a Sharia Commission, and Zakat Commission, and a hisbah, i.e. "a group expected to promote Islamic virtue, whilst discouraging vice".  According to some critics (Leo Igwe, chair of the board of trustees for the Humanist Association of Nigeria), the adoption of Sharia law violates Article 10 of the Nigerian constitution guaranteeing religious freedom.

States
Twelve out of Nigeria's thirty-six states have Islam as the dominant religion. In 1999, those states chose to have Sharia courts as well as Customary courts.

As of 2012, the following 12 states have instituted Sharia:

 Zamfara State (27 January 2000)
 Kano State (21 June 2000)
 Sokoto State
 Katsina State
 Bauchi State (June 2001)
 Borno State
 Jigawa State
 Kebbi State
 Yobe State
 Kaduna State
 Niger State (4 May 2000)
 Gombe State

Hisbah
To promote Islamic virtue and discourage vice, each of the twelve states has a Hisbah group, but each of these hisbah is "unique".  For example, as of 2016: 
"Kano and Zamfara hisbah have their foundations in state law", "have a legally sanctioned board or commission with state-wide powers", and get state funding to pay the salaries of "thousands of people". The hisbah in Gombe state "has no legal backing", no supporting legislation, no "state funding, and is made up of  volunteers" who "sometimes have to contribute financially to the running of the organization". Borno state hisbah "exists only on paper."

According to Human Rights Watch,  hisbah activities in Nigeria bear a similarity to other vigilante groups in that country, in that they are "made up mostly of locally-recruited young men who usually patrol their own neighborhoods and sometimes instantly administer punishments on people suspected of carrying out an offense, without, or before, handing them over to the police". 

Human Rights Watch sees as problematic the fact that "the majority" of hisbah members have "a low level of formal education, no background in law, and no training in law enforcement or procedures for arrest, investigation, or gathering of evidence.  Human Rights Watch is not aware of any women joining the hisbah in Nigeria."  While there are not set laws on hisbah procedure, according to a "common understanding" of what hisbah are allowed to do, "they are expected to arrest criminals", but not "to enter people’s private homes or spy on them merely on the basis of suspicion".  In practice, "these and other guidelines" have  often been disregarded and people’s "right to privacy" violated. 
While Hisbah members have been responsible for "flogging and beating suspected criminals", unlike some vigilante groups "as of 2004, Human Rights Watch was not aware of killings by hisba members".  After Shari’a was introduced, "from 2000 to around 2002, there were "numerous reports of abuses by the hisbah", with flogging and beating punishments administered on the spot, particularly by non-official hisbah, but by 2003 abuses by the hisbah "appear to have decreased".

According to the Nigeria Stability and Reconciliation Programme (NSRP), while the "coercive disciplinary functions" of hisbah attract media attention, hisbah are also  or could also be involved in dispute resolution, marriage counselling, helping the poor, etc.

Blasphemy 
Blasphemy is a criminal offense in both the Nigerian civil law and shari'a law. Some notable cases have been overturned or sent back to be retried. On August 10 2020,   Omar Farouq, a 16-year-old (tried as an adult under Islamic law having passed puberty), was sentenced to 10 years in prison with menial labour for "using foul language toward Allah in an argument with a friend."  The case was protested by UNICEF, and after being held "for over five months with no access to family or lawyers" the case was overturned by the appellate division of the Kano State High Court and Farouq was released.   Yahaya Sharif-Aminu, 22-year-old music studio assistant was sentenced to death on August 10 2020, for making "a blasphemous statement against Prophet Mohammed in a WhatsApp Group," was "remitted back to the Sharia court for a retrial due to procedural irregularities".

Violations and issues of Sharia

Music
Hisbah have targeted the playing of music as un-Islamic. In Kano State, on May 30, 2003,  a group of about twenty hisbah disrupted a wedding party on the basis that it was an “immoral gathering” and that music was being played. Several guests, musicians and members of the wedding ceremony were beaten and injured.  Musical instruments and a windscreen of a vehicle parked at the house  were smashed as well.  According to the police, the hisbah were armed with knives, sticks, and various swords.  In an example of a clash between police and hisbah, local police arrested about thirty members of the hisbah, however, they were all released without charge.

Homosexuality 
Homosexuality is a criminal offence in both the civil and shari'a law. The two most common religions in Nigeria, Islam and Christianity, as well as the traditions of the people forbade homosexuality. 

In 2014, homosexual men were targeted by Hisbah, the religious police. In Nigeria, federal law criminalizes homosexual behaviour, but states with Sharia law impose stiffer punishments such as death penalty though it has not been implemented but other punishments are given.

in December 2018, several women in Kano were arrested by the Hisbah  for allegedly planning a same-sex wedding. In January 2019 the 11 women were fined by the Sharia court under the state’s Immoral Acts law.

In July 2022, three men aged 20, 30 and 70 years old were charged with "committing the offence of sodomy" and sentenced to death by stoning (rajm).

Manequins
As of June 30 2021, the Kano State Hisbah Board (Kano State is the most populous in Nigeria as of the most recent census) banned the use of mannequins "to display clothes by tailors, supermarkets and boutique owners" in Kano state. The Hisbah Commander-in-Chief, Ustaz Harun Muhammad Sani Ibn Sina issued a statement: “Hisbah prohibits the use of mannequins at shops, commercial and private residences and other public places. This violates Islamic provisions, it is also responsible for immoral thoughts among some members of the public, all these are against Islam."  In August 2021 it forbade the use of mannequins with heads to advertise clothing in shops, Ibn Sina stating,   "Islam frowns on idolatry. With the head on it looks like a human being."   the headless mannequins should be "covered at all times" because to show "the shape of the breast, the shape of the bottom, is contrary to the teachings of Sharia".

Alcohol
In 2020 the Kano State Hisbah Board implemented the destruction of 1,975,000 bottles of beer worth over N200 million (almost $500,000 USD)  that had been confiscated within metropolitan Kano.

Haircuts
In 2020, the Kano State Islamic police shaved off the Mohawk hairstyles of young men on the pavements of Kano city.  Another report state that  afro hair was punished by Hisbah in Kaduna state.

Execution(s) 

From the time Nigeria's Sharia courts were reintroduced in 1999 to 2020, only one death sentence passed by the courts has been carried out. In 2002,  a man who pleading guilty to murdering a woman and her two children, was convicted  under Sharia laws in Katsina State and hanged.

Sharia Court of Appeals 
Recognized as a federal court of appeals under the government of Nigeria, the Sharia Court of Appeals is the most controversial of the judicial system. It exists within the Federal Capital Territory of Nigeria and is a part of the Unified Courts System. The Sharia Court of Appeals reviews cases involving Sharia law, particularly in the North and Northeast regions of the country. This has caused controversy because while the Sharia Court of Appeals interprets and reviews cases relating to Islamic law, they must also interpret the common and customary laws of the other regions of Nigeria.

Controversy

Some argue that as implemented in the north, Sharia violates the Constitution of Nigeria.

Legal status
Sharia used to be categorized as a customary law in Nigeria. This position has changed given the judicial pronouncement in the case of Alkamawa V Bello(1998) LPELR-SC.293/1991 Hence, Sharia is now seen as a distinct and universal legal system.

Protests and non-Muslims
There have been numerous riots over the implementation of Sharia, primarily involving non-Muslim minorities in the states that implemented the system. One riot against "the decision of the Kano state government to adopt Sharia law" led to the death over 100 people in October 2001 in Kano State.

In theory the sharia legal system and hisbah enforcement apply only to Muslims, but according to the BBC, "in reality, non-Muslims come under pressure to adhere to the hisbah's rulings". In 2020 trucks carrying alcoholic beverages belonging to non-Muslims were destroyed and bars were raided by the hisbah after it accused owners of "corrupt acts".

Amina Lawal 

In 2002, negative light was brought to Sharia in northern Nigeria when Amina Lawal, a single mother in Katsina State, was accused of adultery and sentenced to death by stoning by a state Sharia court for conceiving a child out of wedlock; the father was released without conviction for lack of evidence. Lawal's conviction provoked outrage both in southern Nigeria and the West, with many national and international NGOs lobbying the federal government to overturn her conviction. In 2004, the conviction was overturned by the Sharia court of appeal, it ruled that pregnancy was insufficient evidence for the sentence to be carried out and Lawal returned to private life.

Safiya Hussaini

See also

Religion in Nigeria
Blasphemy law in Nigeria
Polygamy in Nigeria

Notes

References

External links
 Sharia favours the rich, claim Nigerian rights activists RFI English